The Tour des Pyrénées was a road bicycle race held annually in France and Spain. It was organized as a 2.2 event on the UCI Europe Tour.

Winners

References

UCI Europe Tour races
Cycle races in France
1995 establishments in France
2010 disestablishments in France
Recurring sporting events established in 1995
Cycle races in Spain
Defunct cycling races in France
Defunct cycling races in Spain